Dakota Township is a defunct civil township in Adams County, North Dakota, United States. The 1960 census recorded a population of 63.

The township dissolved prior to the 1980 Census, when it was combined with Cedar Butte, Jordan, Kansas City and Spring Butte Townships to form the Census-designated East Adams Unorganized Territory. As of the 1990 Census, the combined area had a population of 146.

References

External links 
 Official 1968 Adams County, North Dakota Farm & Ranch Directory Directory Service Company Provided by Farm and Home, 1968

Adams County
Defunct townships in Adams County, North Dakota